The New Unity (JV) is a centre-right political alliance in Latvia. Its members are Unity, the Latgale Party and four other regional parties, and it is orientated towards liberal-conservatism and liberalism.

History 
Before the 2018 Latvian parliamentary elections the Unity party formed the New Unity party alliance (the party itself is still registered as Unity) in April 2018 together with the regional For Kuldīga Municipality, For Valmiera and Vidzeme and  parties, joined by the Jēkabpils Regional Party in June.

The Latgale Party, a previous partner of Unity that had run on its list in the past, initially was uncertain whether to join the alliance, since a faction of the party supported a partnership with the Latvian Association of Regions, ended up ultimately signing a cooperation agreement in July. An offer to join the list was also extended to the liberal Movement For! and the centre-left Progressives, but both parties eventually declined.

While the JV list performed poorly at the 2018 elections, surpassing the 5% threshold by only 1.7% and becoming the smallest party in the newly elected parliament, the subsequent failure of the candidates for PM from the New Conservative Party and KPV LV to form a government by early January 2019 urged the President of Latvia, Raimonds Vējonis, to offer the opportunity to JV's candidate, former MEP Krišjānis Kariņš. The Kariņš cabinet, consisting of JV, the New Conservatives, KPV LV, Development/For!, the National Alliance was approved by the Saeima on 23 January 2019. Alongside the Prime Minister's office, the alliance controls two ministries: the Ministry of Foreign Affairs and the Ministry of Finance.

Members

Election results

Legislative elections

European Parliament elections

See also 
 List of political parties in Latvia

References

2018 establishments in Latvia
Conservative parties in Latvia
European People's Party
Liberal conservative parties
Liberal parties in Latvia
Political parties established in 2018
Political party alliances in Latvia